Poecilochirus is a Holarctic genus of mites in the family Parasitidae. They are relatively large (ca. 0.5-1mm) and often found on rotting corpses, where they are transported by beetles. Deuteronymphs are characterized by two orange dorsal shields and in many species a transverse band on the sternal shield. The juvenile development consists of a larval stage (three pairs of legs), protonymph, and deuteronymph, but no tritonymph. Females are smaller than males. Males guard female deuteronymphs shortly before these mate, and pairs mate venter-to-venter.

Reportedly, some nematodes in the family Allantonematidae are parasites of mites in this genus. Although some species from this genus have been described and sampled on previous real forensic cases or successional studies on carcasses, their usefulness as a forensic marker in forensic entomology has been recently appreciated.

Phoresy on carrion beetles 

At least eight species of the genus are carried from one food source to another by beetles of multiple genera in the family Silphidae, most notably burying beetles. The mite deutonymphs sit on the adult beetles, typically between the coxae or under the elytrons. The beetles breed on carrion, which some species bury. Once arrived on carrion, the mites leave the beetles, feed on the carrion, and develop into adults. The entire life cycle of the mites takes place on the carrion, and the young mites later leave again with the beetles.

The probably best studied species are from the Poecilochirus carabi species complex that consists of at least two species (P. carabi and P. necrophori). In Europe, the two mite species are specialized on two different species of burying beetles, Nicrophorus vespilloides and Nicrophorus vespillo. The mites can recognize their main host beetle species and can produce more offspring along their preferred host beetle. Similarly, two genetic lines of Poecilochirus carabi mites have been reported from North America, which specialize on different sets of Nicrophorus hosts in some populations. 

It is debated whether the mites harm the beetles or benefit them. Under certain conditions, the mites appear to protect the beetles' larvae or their food supply from fly larvae, but the presence of mites on beetle-tended carcasses also reduces male beetle life span and the number of beetle offspring.

Species and Identification
There is no recent treatment of the genus Poecilochirus. Identification keys mostly rely on the extent of a dark band across the sternal shield, the size of the dorsal shields, the doral chaetotaxy (mainly the length of the setae), and appendices of the fixed digit of the chelicerae. The first description of all life stages was published by Neumann.

A study of the Poecilochirus carabi complex genetics  suggests that the species complex consists of many more than only two species (P. necrophori and P. carabi). The mites from Asia and America that would previously have been identified as P. carabi based on their morphology are from  distinct genetic lineages. Data suggest that there may be 17 different P. carabi complex species that are not yet described. In addition, the mites that have been identified as P. subterraneus based on their morphology also likely belong to more than one species.

References 

Parasitidae